Staro Selo is a village in northeastern Bulgaria. It is located in the Republic, District Silistra.

Geography
Staro selo is located in the Danube Valley, 5 km from the Danube, in the valley of the former Old River. Currently the river is dry, but archaeological excavations prove that it ever sailed ships. The village is surrounded on all sides by dense forests. Currently in the old village has no more than 1,000 residents who are engaged in agriculture, animal husbandry and horticulture.

References

Villages in Silistra Province
Populated places on the Danube